Marys River may refer to:

 Marys River (Illinois)
 Marys River (Nevada)
 Marys River (Oregon)

See also
 St. Mary's River (disambiguation)
 Mary River (disambiguation)